José María Pinedo Goycochea (22 August 1893−3 September 1971) was a Chilean politician who served as deputy.

He was professor at the Law Schools of the University of Chile (1934−1937) and the Pontifical Catholic University of Valparaíso, his alma mater.

References

External links
 Profile at Annales de la República

1893 births
1971 deaths
21st-century Chilean politicians
Pontifical Catholic University of Valparaíso alumni
Academic staff of the Pontifical Catholic University of Valparaíso
Conservative Party (Chile) politicians